The Yomut carpet is a type of Turkmen rug traditionally handwoven by the Yomut or Yomud, one of the major tribes of Turkmenistan.  A Yomut design, along with designs of the four other major tribes, such as Ersari and Tekke, is featured on the coat of arms and the flag of Turkmenistan.

See also
Suzani rug
Turkmen rug
Tush kyiz

Turkic rugs and carpets
Turkmenistan culture
Ethnic Turkmen culture